Dark 7 White is a Hindi-language Indian crime thriller web series which is directed by Sattvik Mohanty and produced by Ekta Kapoor under the production house Sphere Origins & Balaji Telefilms. The series is an adaptation of the novel ‘‘Dark White’’ by author Shweta Brijpuria. The show stars Sumeet Vyas, Monica Chaudhary, Tanya Kalra, Rachit Bahal, Kunj Anand, Jatin Sarna, Nidhi Singh, Shekhar Choudhary & Sanjay Batra. The series was digitally released on both ZEE5 & ALT Balaji on November 24, 2020.

Plot 
The story revolves around Yudi (Sumeet Vyas) who is the upcoming CM of Rajasthan. However his dream of being the youngest Chief Minister comes to an unexpected end when he's murdered in broad daylight. His 7 closest friends become prime suspects as each one of them has a strong motive. Abhimanyu Singh (Jatin Sarna) is the cop investigating the case and as the mystery unfolds, many dark secrets unravel.

Cast 
 Sumeet Vyas as Yudhveer "Yudi" Singh Rathore
 Monica Chaudhary as Neelu
 Tanya Kalra as Greeshma
 Rachit Bahal as Dhaval
 Kunj Anand as Kush Lamba
 Jatin Sarna as Abhimanyu Singh
 Nidhi Singh as Daisy
 Shekhar Choudhary as Yogesh Khataria
 Sanjay Batra as Shamsher
Madhurima Roy as Tashi
Kunj Anand as Kush Lamba

Release 
Dark 7 White released through ZEE5 & ALT Balaji simultaneously on 24 November 2020.

Reception 
Tatsam Mukherjee from Firstpost highlighted the shows inability to engage with the viewers and other underwhelming aspects of the show.

Nandani Ramnath from the Scroll.in appreciated Pranjal Saxena and Shashank Kunwar energetically churn out cod dialogues, however she wasn't impressed with the loosely executed plot.

Pramit Chatterjee from Mashable stated the show as "A Mind-numbing Political Thriller For Internet Edgelords And Ignorant Boomers" 

Prathyush Parasuraman from Filmcompanion stated in his review "Actors like Vyas capable of good performances play caricatures of stereotypes and it is heartening to see them unfettered, and un-embarrassed by the writing, which is click-bait-with-zero-weight."

References

External links 
 
  Dark 7 White on ZEE5
  Dark 7 White on ALT Balaji

Hindi-language web series